The 1999 Canadian Open (known as the du Maurier Open for sponsorship reasons) was a tennis tournament played on outdoor hard courts. It was the 110th edition of the Canada Masters, and was part of the ATP Super 9 of the 1999 ATP Tour, and of the Tier I Series of the 1999 WTA Tour. The men's event took place at the du Maurier Stadium in Montreal, Quebec, Canada, from August 2 through August 8, 1999, and the women's event at the National Tennis Centre in Toronto, Ontario, Canada, from August 16 through August 23, 1999.

WTA entrants

Seeds

Other entrants
The following players received wildcards into the singles main draw:
  Martina Nejedly
  Sonya Jeyaseelan
  Renata Kolbovic

The following players received wildcards into the doubles main draw:
  Renata Kolbovic /  Vanessa Webb
  Lori McNeil /  Alexandra Stevenson

The following players received entry from the qualifying draw:

  María Vento
  Émilie Loit
  Elena Tatarkova
  Nicole Pratt
  Marlene Weingärtner
  Maureen Drake
  Fabiola Zuluaga
  Tatiana Panova

  Magdalena Grzybowska /  Marie-Ève Pelletier
  Gala León García /  María Sánchez Lorenzo

The following players received entry as lucky losers:
  Amélie Cocheteux
  Ángeles Montolio

Finals

Men's singles

 Thomas Johansson defeated  Yevgeny Kafelnikov, 1–6, 6–3, 6–3
It was Thomas Johansson's 1st title of the year, and his 3rd overall. It was his 1st career Masters title.

Women's singles

 Martina Hingis defeated  Monica Seles, 6–4, 6–4
It was Martina Hingis' 6th title of the year, and her 25th overall. It was her 4th Tier I title of the year, and her 9th overall.

Men's doubles

 Jonas Björkman /  Pat Rafter  defeated  Byron Black /  Wayne Ferreira, 6–4, 6–3

Women's doubles

 Jana Novotná /  Mary Pierce defeated  Larisa Neiland /  Arantxa Sánchez Vicario, 6–3, 2–6, 6–3

References

External links
 
 Association of Tennis Professionals (ATP) tournament profile
 Women's Tennis Association (WTA) tournament profile

 
Du Maurier Open
Du Maurier Open
Canadian Open (tennis)
1999 in Canadian tennis